Pseudosmermus is a genus of beetles in the family Cerambycidae, containing the following species:

 Pseudosmermus grisescens Pic, 1934
 Pseudosmermus tonkinensis Breuning, 1969
 Pseudosmermus viridescens Breuning, 1974

References

Agapanthiini